Swoon is a 1992 independent film written and directed by Tom Kalin. It is an account of the 1924 Leopold and Loeb murder case, focusing more on the homosexuality of the killers than other films based on the case. It stars Daniel Schlachet as Loeb and Craig Chester as Leopold.

Along with the films of Todd Haynes, Gregg Araki and others, Swoon is identified as part of the New Queer Cinema.

Plot

Cast
 Daniel Schlachet as Richard Loeb
 Craig Chester as Nathan Leopold Jr.
 Ron Vawter as State's Attorney Crowe
 Michael Kirby as Detective Savage
 Michael Stumm as Doctor Bowman
 Valda Z. Drabla as Germaine Reinhardt
 Natalie Stanford as Susan Lurie
 Glenn Backes as James Day

Awards
 1992 Berlin International Film Festival - Caligari Film Award, Best Feature - Tom Kalin
 1992 Sundance Film Festival - Cinematography Award (Dramatic) - Ellen Kuras, nominated for Grand Jury Prize
 1993 Independent Spirit Awards - Nominated for Best Cinematography (Ellen Kuras), Best Director (Tom Kalin), Best First Feature, and Best Male Lead (Craig Chester)
 1992 Gotham Awards - Open Palm Award - Tom Kalin
 1992 Stockholm International Film Festival - FIPRESCI Prize for Best Feature, Audience Award
 1993 Fantasporto - Directors' Week Award - Tom Kalin

See also
 Compulsion
 Rope

External links
 
 
 

1992 films
1992 crime drama films
1992 independent films
1992 LGBT-related films
American crime drama films
American LGBT-related films
American courtroom films
Films based on the Leopold and Loeb murder
Films produced by Christine Vachon
Films set in Chicago
Killer Films films
Sundance Film Festival award winners
1990s English-language films
1990s American films